Scooby-Doo Meets the Boo Brothers is a 1987 animated made-for-television film produced by Hanna-Barbera as part of the Hanna-Barbera Superstars 10 series. The two-hour film aired in syndication.

Plot
Shaggy discovers that his uncle Colonel Beauregard has died and left him his country estate, which is on a Southern plantation. After being chased away by a ghost witch, Shaggy, Scooby and Scrappy head for the estate in order to claim Shaggy's inheritance. Before they can get there, they meet Sheriff Rufus Buzby, who warns them about the whole estate being haunted and that they should leave. Before he can fully convince them, he receives a call from dispatch, notifying him that a circus train has derailed and a circus ape has escaped. Leaving Shaggy, Scooby and Scrappy, they continue driving, but upon their arrival they are pursued by a headless horseman, a ghost wolf, and by the alleged ghost of the Colonel who taunts them, telling them to leave or else they will face the consequences.

They also meet the creepy manservant Farquard who tells them that a vast fortune in jewels is hidden somewhere on the estate, which he believes is rightfully his and that Shaggy has no business there. Initially, Shaggy wants to leave, but before they can do that, his truck sinks into quicksand, forcing him, Scooby and Scrappy to spend the night there. With ghosts haunting the place, Scrappy has the idea to call a group of ghost exterminators called The Boo Brothers. Surprisingly, the exterminators—Meako, Freako, and Shreako—are themselves ghosts styled after The Three Stooges, who proceed to hunt down the ghosts that are haunting the estate, with little success. On top of all, Shaggy meets Sadie Mae Scroggins and her shotgun totting older brother Billy Bob Scroggins whose family has an old feud with the colonel. After knowing that Shaggy is related to the colonel, Sadie falls in love with him and Billy Bob wants to shoot him.

After things calm down a little, Shaggy, Scooby and Scrappy decide to go to the kitchen to eat something, only to find proof that the famous fortune in jewels is real, when they find a diamond with a clue to a treasure hunt. Intrigued by that very first clue, the gang decides to hunt down the rest of the jewels much to Farquard's chagrin and Sheriff Buzby, who is on the trail of an escaped circus Gorilla, and is skeptical about the jewels' existence.

They follow the trail through a number of clues that the Colonel has hidden for them, which takes them to several different points in the mansion and also in the rest of the plantation. As they progress in their treasure hunt, things become harder, with numerous ghosts appearing, including the Ghost of Colonel Beauregard, the Headless Horseman, and the Skull Ghost. To make matters worse, they also have to deal with Billy Bob Scroggins and his sister Sadie Mae, the escaped Ape, and a very angry Bear, who keep showing up. On top of that, the Boo Brothers reveal themselves incapable of getting rid of any ghost, only causing more mayhem whenever they try to help.

After much treasure hunting, they finally find the last clue, revealing that the treasure is hidden in the mansion's fireplace, much to the happiness of the Skull Ghost, who holds the gang at gun point, and tries to claim it for himself. After catching him, they find out that the person behind the Skull Ghost is the Sheriff. As they unmask the ghost, the real Sheriff comes in, revealing that the Skull Ghost is actually his greedy twin brother, T.J. Buzby impersonating him, as well as the remaining ghosts that were haunting the place.

With the treasure found, Shaggy is taken by the Boo Brothers' story that they need a home to haunt, so he turns the mansion over to them and the treasure is put into the Beauregard Trust Fund for Orphans. Saying their goodbyes, Shaggy and the dogs drive back home. Along the way, they encounter once more the ghost of Colonel Beauregard, which Shaggy thinks is another prank of Scooby's, until he realizes it's real, and speeds away as fast as possible.

Cast
 Don Messick as Scooby-Doo, Scrappy-Doo
 Casey Kasem as Shaggy
 Sorrell Booke as Sheriff Rufus Buzby, T.J. Buzby
 William Callaway as Billy Bob Scroggins, Beauregard's Ghost, Ape, Ghost in Attic, and Headless Horseman
 Victoria Carroll as Sadie Mae Scroggins
 Jerry Houser as Meako
 Arte Johnson as Farquard and Skull Ghost
 Rob Paulsen as Shreako and Dispatcher
 Michael Rye as Mayor
 Ronnie Schell as Freako and Demonstrator Ghost
 Hamilton Camp as Ghostly Laugh (uncredited)
 June Foray as Witch (uncredited)

Home media
The film was first released on VHS by Hanna-Barbera Home Video and Kids Klassics in the late 1980s and later on Warner Home Video in 2000.

Warner Home Video released Scooby-Doo Meets the Boo Brothers on DVD in Region 1 on May 6, 2003.

Follow-up film
A follow up film, Scooby-Doo and the Ghoul School, was released on October 16, 1988.

See also
 Hanna-Barbera Superstars 10
 Scooby-Doo and the Ghoul School
 Scooby-Doo! and the Reluctant Werewolf

References

External links
 

1987 television films
1987 animated films
1987 films
1980s American animated films
1980s children's animated films
1980s ghost films
Hanna-Barbera animated films
Scooby-Doo animated films
Hanna–Barbera Superstars 10
Films based on television series
Animated films based on animated series
American children's animated fantasy films
Television films based on television series
American children's animated comedy films
American animated television films
American ghost films
Films directed by Ray Patterson (animator)
American comedy horror films
Films with screenplays by Jim Ryan (writer)
American comedy television films
1980s English-language films